The Bargi are a Hindu caste found in the states of Rajasthan and Uttar Pradesh in India. They have been granted Scheduled Caste status in Rajasthan, and their population according 2001 Census of India was 10,739.

Origin 

The Bargi claim descent from the Bargala Rajputs, and their historic homeland is the ancient region of Braj Desa, which now forms parts of Mathura and Agra districts of Uttar Pradesh and the districts of Bharatpur and Dholpur in Rajasthan. The Bargi have now spread to Jaipur District as well, and they speak Braj Bhasha, although many in Rajasthan now understand Rajasthani.

Present circumstance 

The Bargi are strictly Endogamous, and practice clan exogamy. They are further divided into fifty two clans, each of these clans have their tribal goddess. 

Historically, the Bargi of Bharatpur and Dholpur states served as soldiers in the state army, with agriculture being an important secondary occupation. Their customs are similar to other neighbouring Hindu peasant castes such as the Ahir, Jats and Gujars.

See also 

Bargala

References 

Social groups of Uttar Pradesh
Social groups of Rajasthan